Lee Sedol (born 2 March 1983), or Lee Se-dol, is a former South Korean professional Go player of 9 dan rank. As of February 2016, he ranked second in international titles (18), behind only Lee Chang-ho (21). He is the fifth-youngest (12 years 4 months) to become a professional Go player in South Korean history behind Cho Hun-hyun (9 years 7 months), Lee Chang-ho (11 years 1 months), Cho Hye-yeon (11 years 10 months) and Choi Cheol-han (12 years 2 months). His nickname is "The Strong Stone" ("Ssen-dol"). In March 2016, he played a notable series of matches against AlphaGo that ended in 1–4.

On 19 November 2019, Lee announced his retirement from professional play, stating that he could never be the top overall player of Go due to the increasing dominance of AI. Lee referred to them as being "an entity that cannot be defeated".

Biography
Lee was born in South Korea in 1983 and studied at the Korea Baduk Association. He ranks second in international titles (18), behind only Lee Chang-ho (21). Despite this, he describes his opening play as "very weak". In February 2013, Lee announced that he planned to retire within three years and move to the U.S. to promote Go. He plays on Tygem as "gjopok". He is known as 'Bigeumdo Boy' because he was born and grew up on Bigeumdo Island.

He is married to Kim Hyun-jin, and he has a daughter, Lee Hye-rim. His older brother  is also a 9 dan professional go player.

Lee's Broken Ladder Game
This game was played between Lee Sedol and Hong Chang-sik during the 2003 KAT cup, on 23 April 2003. The game is notable for Lee's use of a broken ladder formation.

Normally playing out a broken ladder is a mistake, associated with beginner play, because the chasing stones are left appallingly weak. Between experts it should be decisive, leading to a lost game. Lee, playing black, defied the conventional wisdom, using the broken ladder to capture a large group of Hong's stones in the lower-right side of the board. This brought black's stones in the corner which were previously considered dead back to life. White ultimately resigned.

Match against AlphaGo

Starting March 9, 2016, Lee played a five-game match, broadcast live, against the computer program AlphaGo, developed by a London-based artificial intelligence firm Google DeepMind, for a $1 million match prize. He said “I have heard that Google DeepMind’s AI is surprisingly strong and getting stronger, but I am confident that I can win at least this time”. In an interview with Sohn Suk-hee of JTBC Newsroom on February 22, 2016, he showed confidence in his chances again, while saying that even beating AlphaGo by 4–1 may allow the Google DeepMind team to claim its de facto victory and the defeat of him, or even humanity. In this interview he pointed out the time rule in this match, which seems well-balanced so that both he and the AI would fairly undergo time pressure. In another interview at Yonhap News, Lee Se-dol said that he was confident of beating AlphaGo by a score of 5–0, at least 4–1 and accepted the challenge in only five minutes. He also stated "Of course, there would have been many updates in the last four or five months, but that isn’t enough time to challenge me".

On March 9, Lee played black and lost the first game by resignation. On March 10, he played white and lost the second game by resignation. On March 12, he played black and lost the third game as well. On March 13, he played white and won the fourth game, following an unexpected move at White 78 described as "a brilliant tesuji", and by Gu Li 9 dan as a "divine move" and completely unforeseen by him. GoGameGuru commented that this game was "a masterpiece for Lee Sedol and will almost certainly become a famous game in the history of Go". Lee commented after the victory that he considered AlphaGo was strongest when playing white (second). For this reason, and because he thought winning a second time with black would be more valuable than winning with white, he requested that he play black in the final fifth game, which is considered more risky when following Chinese Go rules. On March 15, he played black and lost the fifth game, to lose the Go series 1–4.

After his fourth-match victory, Lee was overjoyed: "I don't think I've ever felt so good after winning just one match. I remember when I said I will win all or lose just one game in the beginning. If this had really happened ― I won 3 rounds and lost this round ― it would have had a great bearing on my reputation. However, since I won after losing 3 games in a row, I am so happy. I will never exchange this win for anything in the world." He added: "I, Lee Se-dol, lost, but mankind did not." After the last match, however, Lee was saddened: "I failed. I feel sorry that the match is over and it ended like this. I wanted it to end well." He also confessed that "As a professional Go player, I never want to play this kind of match again. I endured the match because I accepted it."

Retirement from professional play
On 19 November 2019, Lee Sedol announced his retirement from professional play, stating that "Even if I become the number one, there is an entity that cannot be defeated."

However, in December he agreed to play a three-game match against the HanDol AI system, developed by Korean NHN Entertainment Corporation. Playing with a two-stone handicap (advantage) for the first and third games of the match and no handicap for the second game, Lee Sedol defeated the machine in the first game. HanDol subsequently won the remaining two games of the match, with a final score of two-to-one, winning the overall contest.

Promotion record
Lee Sedol turned pro in 1995 as 1 dan, and reached 9 dan in 2003.

Career record

Titles and runners-up
 
Ranks #3 in total number of titles in Korea and #2 in international titles.

Korean Baduk League

Chinese A League

References

External links

 Yi Se-Tol on Sensei's Library
Korea Baduk Association profile (in Korean)

On YouTube
 1st match against AlphaGo
 2nd match against AlphaGo  
 3rd match against AlphaGo 
 4th match against AlphaGo 
 5th match against AlphaGo
 AlphaGo (documentary featuring Lee)

1983 births
Living people
South Korean Go players
Sportspeople from South Jeolla Province
Asian Games medalists in go
Go players at the 2010 Asian Games
Asian Games gold medalists for South Korea
Medalists at the 2010 Asian Games